Martine Coulombe is a Canadian politician, who was elected to the Legislative Assembly of New Brunswick in the 2010 provincial election. She represented the electoral district of Restigouche-La-Vallée as a member of the Progressive Conservatives until the 2014 election, when she was defeated by Gilles LePage in the redistributed riding of Restigouche West.

She is the sister of federal Member of Parliament Bernard Valcourt.

References

Progressive Conservative Party of New Brunswick MLAs
Women MLAs in New Brunswick
People from Restigouche County, New Brunswick
Living people
Members of the Executive Council of New Brunswick
21st-century Canadian politicians
21st-century Canadian women politicians
Women government ministers of Canada
Year of birth missing (living people)